Shabadham is a 1984 Indian Malayalam film, directed and produced by M. R. Joseph. The film stars Srividya, Ratheesh, Sukumaran and Balan K. Nair in the lead roles. The film has musical score by Raveendran.

Cast
Srividya as Sreedevi 
Ratheesh as Pradeep 
Sukumaran as Sathyasheelan 
Balan K. Nair as Shekara Pilla 
Rohini as Radha 
Captain Raju as Prasad 
Kuthiravattom Pappu as Kunjan Nair 
Jose Prakash as Vishwanathan Thampi 
Jagathy Sreekumar as Phalgunan 
Sabitha Anand as Seetha
Rani Padmini as Padmini 
Kaduvakulam Antony as Constable Paramu Pilla 
Thodupuzha Radhakrishnan as Phalgunan's father 
Anuradha as Appearance in a song

Soundtrack
The music was composed by Raveendran and the lyrics were written by Mankombu Gopalakrishnan and Devadas.

References

External links
 

1984 films
1980s Malayalam-language films